Elaphriella paulinae is a species of sea snail, a marine gastropod mollusk, in the family Solariellidae.

Distribution
This species occurs in the following locations:
 Austral Islands
 Coral Sea
 Loyalty Ridge
 Solomon Islands

References

Solariellidae